Atre Bezabeh (born 12 June 1954) is an Ethiopian sprinter. He competed in the men's 4 × 400 metres relay at the 1980 Summer Olympics.

References

1954 births
Living people
Athletes (track and field) at the 1980 Summer Olympics
Ethiopian male sprinters
Ethiopian male middle-distance runners
Olympic athletes of Ethiopia
Place of birth missing (living people)